For the First Time Anywhere is a compilation album by American rock and roll singer Buddy Holly. The album was released in February 1983 (see 1983 in music).

For the First Time Anywhere features the undubbed versions of songs previously released with overdubs by the Fireballs.

At the time of release this was considered an important release for Holly fans and awarded with a four star review from Rolling Stone.

Track listing 

Side A
 "Rock-A-Bye Rock"
 "Maybe Baby" (1st Version)
 "Because I Love You"
 "I'm Gonna Set My Foot Down"
 "Changing All Those Changes"
Side B
 "That's My Desire"
 "Baby Won't You Come Out Tonight"
 "It's Not My Fault"
 "Brown-Eyed Handsome Man"
 "Bo Diddley"

References

External links 

Buddy Holly compilation albums
1983 compilation albums
Compilation albums published posthumously
MCA Records compilation albums
albums produced by Norman Petty